Gowganda is a Dispersed Rural Community and unincorporated place in geographic Nicol Township, Timiskaming District, in northeastern Ontario, Canada. It is at the outlet of the Montreal River from Lake Gowganda, and is on Ontario Highway 560.

References

External links
 Gowganda profile at the James Bay Frontier Travel Association
 North Ontario Fishing Maps  Angler's Atlas map download

Communities in Timiskaming District